Schwäbische Zeitung (German for "Swabian Newspaper") is a daily newspaper published by Medienhaus Schwäbisch Media, Schwäbischer Verlag in Ravensburg, Baden-Württemberg, Germany. It was founded in Leutkirch im Allgäu on December 4, 1945 and is one of the largest regional subscription newspapers in Baden-Württemberg. The paid circulation is 161,671 copies, a decrease of 18 percent since 1998. Until the move to Ravensburg in January 2013, Leutkirch was also the headquarters of the publishing house and the central editorial office. The Schwäbische Zeitung is said to have a regional monopoly position in its geographical area.

Technical data

The newspaper has the Rhenish format with a type area (width × height) of 320 mm × 480 mm. It has seven columns, resulting in a column width of 44.4 mm.

References

External links
 

Newspapers published in Germany
Ravensburg
German news websites